"Bad, Bad Whiskey" is a song by Maxwell Davis that was released in 1950 by Amos Milburn. The single was the last time Milburn reached the number one position on the US Billboard R&B Chart.

Song Background
The song is usually credited to Maxwell Davis alone, but some sources say it was initially an instrumental titled Bristol Drive, which Milburn adapted by blending in some alcohol-based lyrics.

Cover Versions
Bad, Bad Whiskey became one of the most enduring “blues in a bottle” songs. The song has been covered many times, most recently by Colin James in October 2016 on his album Blue Highways.

Other uses
Bob Dylan played the song in the episode “Spring Cleaning” (Episode 50) of his series Theme Time Radio Hour in April 2007.

References

1950 songs
1950 singles
Songs about alcohol